Alan Sweeney (born 31 October 1956 in Glasgow, Scotland) is a former professional footballer, who played for Huddersfield Town, Hartlepool United and Emley.

References

1956 births
Living people
Scottish footballers
Footballers from Glasgow
Association football defenders
English Football League players
Huddersfield Town A.F.C. players